Hays Travel Limited is an independent travel agent chain headquartered in Sunderland, England. According to recent statistics, the company has the largest number of retail travel shops in the United Kingdom.

History 
Hays Travel was founded in 1980 by John Hays in Seaham, Durham. Hays initially opened a small retail store behind his mother's clothing store. Since May 2018, Hays Travel reached sales of over £1 billion. The company's turnover increased by £42 million over 2017, when pre-tax profit was up slightly to £10.1 million. At the time, the company had around 1,500 employees.

Expansion 
On 9 October 2019, Hays Travel announced that it had purchased all stores from the travel agency Thomas Cook Group, another large travel group headquartered in the UK, which were assumed to be closed due to the business entering liquidation during previous months. The company took over 550 retail locations across the United Kingdom.  News reports at the time indicated that Hays would almost treble the number of existing stores and double its workforce.

By the end of November 2019, Hays stated that it would hire an extra 1,500 staff, in addition to its 2,330 who previously worked for Thomas Cook. The total number of Hays Travel employees would total 5,700 people, after the planned hirings. In March 2020, following the purchase of Thomas Cook, Hays Travel was named as one of the Top 100 Employers in the United Kingdom.

On 3 August 2020, Hays Travel announced up to 878 members of its retail staff would be made redundant.

On 5 September 2020, Hays Travel acquired Tailor Made Travel, a Welsh chain of travel agencies with approximately 100 employees, then announced the closure of 11 of the 19 shops a month later.

References

External links 

1980 establishments in England
Travel agencies
British companies established in 1980
Transport companies established in 1980
Companies based in the City of Sunderland
Travel and holiday companies of the United Kingdom
Privately held companies of England